The Prince Alfred is a grade II* listed public house at 5a Formosa Street, Maida Vale, London, W9. It was first listed as grade II in 1970, and upgraded to grade II* in June 2022 for its lavish interior.

It was built in 1856 and retains its original snob screens. It is on the Campaign for Real Ale's National Inventory of Historic Pub Interiors.

The pub was featured in David Bowie's Grammy Award-winning short film "Jazzin' for Blue Jean" (1984), which served as the music video for his single "Blue Jean".

References

Grade II* listed pubs in the City of Westminster
National Inventory Pubs
Maida Vale